G-Unit Radio may refer to:

G-Unit Radio, a mixtape series by G-Unit
G-Unit Radio, a show on Eminem's Shade 45